Irwin was an electoral district of the Legislative Assembly in the Australian state of Western Australia from 1890 to 1950.

Based in the state's Mid West agricultural region and centred on the town of Dongara, the district was one of the original 30 seats contested at the 1890 election. In 1898, it included Port Denison and a number of towns along the Midland railway, including Dongara, Irwin, Mingenew, Arrino, Carnamah, Coorow, Marchagee, and Watheroo. The district was renamed Irwin-Moore with the abolition of Moore at the 1930 election.

Irwin-Moore was abolished at the 1950 election and the seat of Moore recreated. Sitting member John Ackland of the Country Party successfully transferred to the new seat.

Members

Election results

References 

Irwin